The Sea Scouts BSA National Flagship program was created in conjunction with the Boat Owners Association of the United States. The National Flagship is presented in recognition of excellence in program quality, youth achievement, and adult commitment.

The National Flagship is recognized by receipt of the national Flagship Trophy, a National Flagship Flag emblazoned with four national stars, and the designated shoulder patch for members of the unit. The National Flagship is accompanied by the National Flagship Fleet which recognizes runners-up for the award.

Winners 
 2019 – Confluence, Hampton, Virginia
 2018 – Unique, Palestine, Texas
 2017 – Dominion, Manassas, Virginia
 2016 – Viking, San Francisco, California
 2015 – Enterprise, Rockwall, Texas
 2014 – Dragonlady, Arlington, Virginia
 2013 – Makai, San Leandro, California
 2012 – Albatross, Martinez, California
 2011 – Tsunami, Portland, Oregon
 2010 – Minnow, Houston, Texas
 2009 – Renegade, Newport Beach, California
 2008 – Indomitable, Bay Village, Ohio
 2007 – Dragonlady, Arlington, Virginia
 2006 – DelMar, Newport Beach, California
 2005 – Arcturus, Westover, West Virginia
 2004 – Jolly Roger, Houston, Texas
 2003 – Gryphon, Redwood, City, California
 2002 – Invincible, Houston, Texas

Non-profit organizations based in the United States